Auchmis detersa is a moth of the family Noctuidae first described by Eugenius Johann Christoph Esper in 1791. It is found from north-western Africa through southern and central Europe to Anatolia, Iran, Afghanistan and through Siberia to Lake Baikal.

The wingspan is 40–51 mm. Adults are on wing from June to September.

The young larvae feed on Berberis vulgaris. The larvae overwinter and pupate in May of the following year.

Subspecies
Auchmis detersa detersa (central and southern Europe)
Auchmis detersa demavendi Schwingenschuss, 1955
Auchmis detersa margarita Ronkay & Varga, 1997
Auchmis detersa minoica Reisser, 1958 (Crete)

References

External links
 Fauna Europaea
 "09513 Auchmis detersa (Esper, [1791]) - Berberitzeneule". Lepiforum e. V. 
 Schmetterlinge-Deutschlands.de. 

Acronictinae
Moths of Europe
Moths of Asia
Taxa named by Eugenius Johann Christoph Esper